Atanacković or Atanackovic is a surname. Notable people with the surname include: 

Aleksandar Atanacković (disambiguation)
Aleksandar Atanacković (footballer, born 1920) (1920–2005), Serbian footballer
Aleksandar Atanacković (footballer, born 1980), Serbian footballer
Bogoboj Atanacković (1826–1858), Serbian writer
Branislav Atanacković (born 1983), Serbian football player
Jovan Atanacković (1848–1921), Serbian general
Marko Atanackovic (born 1986), Swedish football player
Platon Atanacković (1788–1867), Serbian writer, linguist, and bishop
Simo Atanacković (born 1990), Slovenian-Bosnian basketball player
Teodor Atanackovic (born 1945), Serbian engineer